Major non-NATO ally (MNNA) is a designation given by the United States government to close allies that have strategic working relationships with the US Armed Forces but are not members of the North Atlantic Treaty Organization (NATO). While the status does not automatically include a mutual defense pact with the United States, it confers a variety of military and financial advantages that otherwise are not obtainable by non-NATO countries. There are currently 19 major non-NATO allies across four continents (11 in Asia, three in Africa, three in South America, and two in Oceania).

History

MNNA status was first created in 1987 when section 2350a, otherwise known as the Sam Nunn Amendment, was added to Title 10 (Armed Forces) of the United States Code by Congress. It stipulated that cooperative research and development agreements could be enacted with non-NATO allies by the Secretary of Defense with the concurrence of the Secretary of State. The initial MNNAs were Australia, Egypt, Israel, Japan, and South Korea.
In 1996, major non-NATO allies received additional military and financial benefits when section 2321k was added to Title 22 (Foreign Relations) of the US Code (also known as section 517 of the Foreign Assistance Act of 1961), which added MNNAs to many of the same exemptions from the Arms Export Control Act that were enjoyed by NATO members. It also authorized the President to designate a nation as an MNNA thirty days after notifying Congress. When enacted, the statute designated the initial five countries as major non-NATO allies, and added Jordan and New Zealand to the list.

Argentina
In 1998, President Bill Clinton named Argentina as an ally for the "Argentine compromise and contribution to international peace and security" materialized in its participation in the Gulf War (being the only South American country to do so), and for its continuing support of United Nations peacekeeping missions.

Brazil
In 2019, Donald Trump designated Brazil as a major non-NATO ally for the "Brazil’s recent commitments to increase defense cooperation with the United States" after receiving a working visit from Brazilian President Jair Bolsonaro.

Colombia 
In March 2022, Joe Biden designated Colombia as a major non-NATO ally. Biden said: "I've said for a long time Colombia is a keystone to our shared efforts to build a hemisphere as prosperous, secure and democratic ... Today I'm proud to announce that I intend to designate Colombia a major non-NATO ally ... that's exactly what you are".

Tunisia 
In May 2015, US President Barack Obama declared his intention to make Tunisia a non-NATO ally while hosting his Tunisian counterpart Beji Caid Essebsi at the White House.

Pakistan 
The designation of certain countries as major non-NATO allies has not been without controversy. In 2017, US Representatives Ted Poe (R-TX) and Rick Nolan (D-MN) introduced H.R. 3000, a bill to revoke Pakistan's position as an MNNA, citing inadequate counterterrorism efforts, the harboring of Osama bin Laden and Pakistani support for the Taliban. The bill never received a vote. In 2021, US Representative Andy Biggs introduced H.R. 35, another version of the legislation.

In 2017, General Joseph Dunford, chairman of the Joint Chiefs of Staff, accused Pakistan's Inter-Services Intelligence (ISI) of having ties to terror groups. Reuters reported that "possible Trump administration responses being discussed include expanding U.S. drone strikes and perhaps eventually downgrading Pakistan's status as a major non-NATO ally."

Qatar 
On January 31, 2022, President Joe Biden announced that Qatar would be made a major non-NATO ally, citing its assistance during the US withdrawal from Afghanistan in August 2021.

Taiwan
When Congress enacted on September 30, 2002, the Foreign Relations Authorization Act for FY 2003, it required that Taiwan be "treated as though it were designated a major non-NATO ally."  Despite some initial misgivings about Congress's perceived intrusion into the President's foreign affairs authority, the Bush administration subsequently submitted a letter to Congress on August 29, 2003, designating Taiwan as a major non-NATO ally.

Southeast Asia 
Around the same time, invitations were sent to the ASEAN members Thailand and the Philippines, both of whom accepted. Singapore was reportedly offered a similar arrangement, but turned down the offer.

New Zealand
US–New Zealand strategic and military cooperation suffered a setback after the breakdown of the ANZUS alliance in 1984 over nuclear ship entry. The designation of New Zealand as an MNNA in 1997 reflected the warming of relations between the two. In June 2012 New Zealand signed a partnership arrangement with NATO further strengthening and consolidating relations.

Potential MNNAs 
Some countries might be close to a designation:

Ukraine, Georgia, and Moldova
In 2014, following the annexation of Crimea by the Russian Federation, a bill was introduced to the United States Congress to grant major non-NATO ally status to Georgia, Moldova, and Ukraine.  A bill to make Ukraine a major non-NATO ally was introduced into the US House of Representatives in May 2019. As of 2022, these changes have not been made despite support from the US Commission on Security and Cooperation in Europe, also known as the Helsinki Commission, following the Russian invasion of Ukraine.

Saudi Arabia and other Arab countries
During a 2015 Camp David summit with the Gulf Cooperation Council states, the Obama administration considered designating Saudi Arabia, the United Arab Emirates (UAE), Oman, and Qatar as MNNAs. Qatar has since been designated as an MNNA.

Iraq
Iraq and the United States have a strategic partnership that was formalized in a Strategic Framework Agreement signed in 2008. The agreement covers a range of areas including security, economics, and culture. The United States has provided military and economic aid to Iraq since the overthrow of Saddam Hussein's regime in 2003. U.S. troops were also deployed in Iraq to support Iraqi security forces in their fight against IS, and although the U.S. combat mission in Iraq ended in 2021, the U.S. continues to provide military and economic assistance to Iraq.

India
In June 2019, US lawmakers provided for enhancements to India's status, though this fell short of making them a MNNA.

Finland and Sweden

According to Finnish newspapers in early March 2022, following the Russian invasion of Ukraine, Finland and Sweden had planned to apply for major non-NATO ally status. Since then, the two countries have applied for membership of NATO itself.

Benefits
Nations named as major non-NATO allies are eligible for the following benefits:

 Entry into cooperative research and development projects with the Department of Defense (DoD) on a shared-cost basis.
 Participation in certain counter-terrorism initiatives.
 Purchase of depleted uranium anti-tank rounds.
 Priority delivery of military surplus (ranging from military rations to ships).
 Possession of War Reserve Stocks of DoD-owned equipment that are kept outside of American military bases.
 Loans of equipment and materials for cooperative research and development projects and evaluations.
 Permission to use American financing for the purchase or lease of certain defense equipment.
 Reciprocal training.
 Expedited export processing of space technology.
 Permission for the country's corporations to bid on certain DoD contracts for the repair and maintenance of military equipment outside the United States.

Major Partners

Israel as Major Strategic Partner

In December 2014, the US House passed the United States–Israel Strategic Partnership Act of 2013. This new category would have placed Israel one notch above the Major Non-NATO Ally classification and would have added additional support for defense and energy infrastructure, and strengthened cooperation through business and academics. The bill additionally called for the US to increase their war reserve stock in Israel to US$1.8 billion. The bill did not reach a vote, and as such did not pass or become law.

India as Major Defense Partner
In 2016, the US recognized India as a "major defense partner". This occurred less than a month after the House of Representatives passed the US India Defense Technology and Partnership Act. This allowed India to buy more advanced and sensitive technologies that is on par with that of US' closest allies and partners. The U.S. has four "foundational agreements" that it signs with India.

List of MNNAs

Current MNNAs
The following countries have been designated as major non-NATO allies of the United States in chronological order of their designation. In addition, an act provides that the Taiwan shall be treated as an MNNA, without formal designation as such:

Former MNNAs
 (2012–2022): Designated by the Obama administration in 2012, and effectively ceased to function as a MNNA when the Taliban, NATO's main adversary in the war in Afghanistan, emerged victorious in 2021. The Biden administration formally notified Congress of its revocation of Afghanistan's MNNA status in July 2022.

 (1996–1999): The government of Poland retains the view that Poland was designated as a MNNA in 1996, a year prior to their application and three years prior to their entry to the NATO alliance, however, no record of this exists from the American side.  During the 1990s, Poland participated in some American-led conflicts, including the Gulf War and Operation Simoom, the latter of which resulted in the US cancelling all post-WW2 debt owed by Poland to the US.

See also
 North Atlantic Treaty Organization (NATO)
 Foreign relations of NATO (including NATO Global Partners)
 Arab–Israeli alliance against Iran
 AUKUS
 ANZUS
 International Maritime Security Construct
 Quadrilateral Security Dialogue

References

1987 establishments in the United States
1987 in international relations
20th-century military alliances
21st-century military alliances
United States and NATO
Foreign relations of the United States
United States foreign relations legislation
Afghanistan–United States military relations
Argentina–United States relations
Australia–United States military relations
Bahrain–United States military relations
Brazil–United States military relations
Colombia–United States relations
Egypt–United States military relations
Israel–United States military relations
Japan–United States military relations
Jordan–United States relations
Kuwait–United States military relations
Morocco–United States military relations
New Zealand–United States military relations
Pakistan–NATO relations
Pakistan–United States military relations
Philippines–United States military relations
Qatar–United States military relations
South Korea–United States military relations
Taiwan–United States military relations
Thailand–United States military relations
Tunisia–United States relations